The main purpose of mining acts in law is to govern the structure of mining authorities and their responsibilities, the entitlement to mining and the oversight of safety in and around the mines. With the introduction of parliamentary legislative powers, they replaced the earlier mining regulations issued by royalty or nobility to their states and territories.

See also 
Bergamt - German mining office
Bergrecht - mining law
Bergregal - mining rights
Bergordnung - mining regulations
Mining law

External links 
 Legal text of the German Federal Mining Act
 General Mining Act for the Prussian States (Allgemeines Berggesetz für die Preussischen Staaten. of 24 June 1865 in the: Zeitschrift für das Berg-, Hütten- und Salinenwesen in dem Preussischen Staate, 13th Volume, pp. 29ff pdf, 53.84 MB

Mining law and governance